Scott Calvert Cartwright (born 7 January 1954) is a former New Zealand rugby union player. A wing, Cartwright represented Canterbury at a provincial level, and was a member of the New Zealand national side, the All Blacks, on their 1976 tour of South America. He played seven matches for the team on that tour including the two matches against Argentina, but these were not given full test status.

References

1954 births
Living people
Rugby union players from Christchurch
People educated at St Andrew's College, Christchurch
New Zealand rugby union players
New Zealand international rugby union players
Canterbury rugby union players
Rugby union wings